Parity measurement (also referred to as Operator measurement) is a procedure in Quantum information science used for error detection in quantum qubits. A parity measurement checks the equality of two qubits to return either a true or false answer, which can be used to determine whether a correction needs to occur.  Additional measurements can be made for a system greater than two qubits. Because parity measurement does not measure the state of singular bits but rather gets information about the whole state, it is considered an example of a joint measurement. Joint measurements do not have the consequence of destroying the original state of a qubit as normal quantum measurements do. Mathematically speaking, parity measurements are used to project a state into an eigenstate of an operator and to acquire its eigenvalue.

Parity measurement is essential to the concept of Quantum Error Correction. From the parity measurement, an appropriate unitary operation can be applied to correct the error without knowing the beginning state of the qubit.

Parity and parity checking 
A parity measurement to determine the equality or inequality of two qubits can be accomplished using a series of CNOT gates, which is then stored in a "check bit", called the ancillary qubit. The unique state of the ancillary qubit is then used to determine either even or odd parity of the qubits. When the qubits of the input states are equal, an even parity will be measured indicating that no error has occurred. When the qubits are unequal, an odd parity will be measured indicating a single bit-flip error.

With more than two qubits, additional parity measurements can be performed to determine if the qubits are the same value, and if not, which is the outlier. For example, in a system of three qubits, we can first perform a parity measurement on the first and second qubit, and then on the first and third qubit.

In a circuit, an ancillary qubit is prepared in the  state. During measurement, a controlled-NOT gate is performed on the ancillary bit dependent on the first qubit being checked, followed by a second controlled-NOT gate performed on the ancillary bit dependent on the second qubit being checked. If these qubits are the same, the double controlled-NOT gates will revert the ancillary qubit to its initial  state, which indicates even parity. If these qubits are not the same, the double controlled-NOT gates will alter the ancillary qubit to the opposite  state, which indicates odd parity. Looking at the ancillary qubits, a corresponding correction can be performed.

Alternatively, the parity measurement can be thought of as a projection of a qubit state into an eigenstate of an operator and to acquire its eigenvalue. For the  measurement, checking the ancilla qubit in the basis  will return the eigenvalue of the measurement. If the eigenvalue here is measured to be +1 , this indicates even parity of the bits without error. If the eigenvalue is measured to be -1, this indicates odd parity of the bits with a bit-flip error.

Example 
Alice, a sender, wants to transmit a qubit to Bob, a receiver. The state of any qubit that Alice would wish to send can be written as  where and are coefficients. Following noise in the channel, the three qubits state can be seen in the following table with the corresponding probability:

A parity measurement can be performed on the altered state, with two ancillary qubits storing the measurement. First, the first and second qubits' parity is checked. The same action is performed comparing the first and third qubits, with the check being stored in the second ancillary qubit. Important to note is that we do not actually need to know the input qubit state, and can perform the CNOT operations indicating the parity without this knowledge. The ancillary qubits are what indicates what bit has been altered, and the   correction operation can be performed as needed.

An easy way to visualize this is in the circuit above. First, the input state  is encoded into 3 bits, and parity checks are performed with subsequent error correction performed based on the results of the ancilla qubits at the bottom. Finally, decoding is performing to put get back to the same basis of the input state.

Parity check matrix 
A parity check matrix for a quantum circuit can also be constructed using these principles. For some message x encoded as Gx, where G corresponds to the generator matrix, Hx = 0 where H is the parity matrix containing 0's and 1's for a situation where there is no error. However, if an error occurs at one component, then the pattern in the errors can be used to find which bit is incorrect.

Types of parity measurements 
Two types of parity measurement are indirect and direct. Indirect parity measurements coincide with the typical way we think of parity measurement as described above, by measuring an ancilla qubit to determine the parity of the input bits. Direct parity measurements differ from the previous type in that a common mode with the parities coupled to the qubits is measured, without the need for an ancilla qubit. While indirect parity measurements can put a strain on experimental capacity, direct measurements may interfere with the fidelity of the initial states.

Example 
After the first Hadamard gate, the state of the circuit is

 

After applying the controlled-U gate, the state of the circuit evolves to

 

After applying the second Hadamard gate, the state of the circuit turns into

 

Experiments and applications 
In experiments, parity measurements are not only a mechanism for quantum error correction, but they can also help combat non-ideal conditions. Given the existent possibility for bit flip errors, there is an additional likelihood for errors as a result of leakage. This phenomenon is due to unused high-energy qubits becoming excited. It has been demonstrated in superconducting transmon qubits that parity measurements can be applied repetitively during quantum error correction to remove leakage errors. Repetitive parity measurements can be used to stabilize an entangled state and prevent leakage errors (which normally is not possible with typical quantum error correction), but the first group to accomplish this did so in 2020. By performing interleaving XX and ZZ checks, which can ultimately tell whether an X (bit), Y (iXZ), or Z (phase) flip error occurs. The outcomes of these parity measurements of ancilla qubits are used with Hidden Markov Models to complete leakage detection and correction.

References 

Quantum information theory
Quantum measurement
Quantum computing